The Jiul de Est ("Eastern Jiu", previously also known as ) is a headwater of the river Jiu in Romania. Its source is in the Șureanu Mountains. At its confluence with the Jiul de Vest in Iscroni, the Jiu is formed.

 means "the Jiu" (with the definite article ).

Tributaries

The following rivers are tributaries to the river Jiul de Est:

Left: Sterminos, Lolea, Câmpa, Jieț, Maleia, Staicu, Sălătruc
Right: Bilele, Răscoala, Taia, Bănița

References

Rivers of Romania
Rivers of Hunedoara County